Orlat is a commune in Sibiu County, Transylvania, Romania,  west of the county capital, Sibiu, in the Mărginimea Sibiului ethnographic area. It is composed of a single village, Orlat.

The commune lies in the foothills of the Cindrel Mountains, on the banks of the river Cibin and its affluents, the rivers Săliște and Orlat.

Orlat is one of the oldest villages in the Mărginimea Sibiului. The 
 (established by an Imperial decree signed by Maria Theresa of Austria on April 15, 1762) was located here. The regiment's mission was to guard the southern sector of the Transylvanian Military Frontier.

The A1 Motorway passes just north of the commune. The Orlat train station serves the CFR Line 200, which runs from Brașov to the Hungarian border at Curtici.

References

Communes in Sibiu County
Localities in Transylvania